Hamburger SV II are the reserve team of German association football club Hamburger SV. Until 2005 the team played as Hamburger SV Amateure.

The team has qualified for the first round of the DFB-Pokal, the German Cup, on five occasions. They currently play in the tier four Regionalliga Nord, in the fourth tier of the German football league system.

History
The team first played in the highest football league in Hamburg when it won promotion to the tier two Amateurliga Hamburg in 1955. The team was relegated from the league again in 1959 but returned in 1961. With the introduction of the Bundesliga in 1963 and the Regionalliga as the second tier below it the Amateurliga dropped to the third tier and was renamed to Landesliga Hamburg. HSV Amateure earned a runner-up finish in the league in 1964 but otherwise remained an undistinguished side in the Landesliga, eventually suffering another relegation in 1972.

The team returned to what had now become the Verbandsliga Hamburg in 1979, initially continuing its trend of mid-table finishes but improving from 1984 onwards. It won three league championships in 1986, 1987 and 1989 but failed to win promotion to the Oberliga Nord in the first two attempts, eventually succeeding in the third. The team played in the Oberliga from 1989 to 1994 as a mid-table side and qualified for the new Regionalliga Nord in 1994 when the league was established.

The team played in the Regionalliga until 2000 when a sixteenth-place finish forced it down to the Oberliga Hamburg/Schleswig-Holstein for two seasons. A league title in the latter in 2002 allowed the club promotion back up to the Regionalliga Nord where it has been playing since, with a third-place finish in 2014–15 as its best result.

The team has also taken part in the DFB-Pokal on five occasions, courtesy to its Hamburger Pokal performance. On four occasions, in 1974–75, 1981–82, 1996–97 and 1997–98, the team was knocked out in the first round but in 1991–92 it advanced to the fourth round before losing 1–0 to Karlsruher SC.

Honours
The team's honours:
Oberliga Hamburg/Schleswig-Holstein
 Champions: 2002
Verbandsliga Hamburg
 Champions: (3) 1986, 1987, 1989
Hamburger Pokal
 Winners: (3) 1991, 1996, 1997

Recent seasons 
The recent season-by-season performance of the club:

 With the introduction of the Regionalligas in 1994 and the 3. Liga in 2008 as the new third tier, below the 2. Bundesliga, all leagues below dropped one tier.

Players

Current squad

Head coaches 
  Christian Titz (2017–2018)
  Steffen Weiß (2018, interim)
  Vahid Hashemian (2018, interim)
  Achim Feifel (2018, interim)
  Steffen Weiß (2018–2019)
  Hannes Drews (2019–)

References

External links

 Official team site
 Hamburger SV II at Weltfussball.de 

+
Football clubs in Hamburg
German reserve football teams
Hamburg reserve football teams